The 1989 Southland Conference men's basketball tournament was held March 4–6 at Super Pit in Denton, Texas.

 defeated  in the championship game, 85–68, to win their first Southland men's basketball tournament.

The Cowboys received a bid to the 1989 NCAA Tournament as #16 seed in the Midwest region. They were the only Southland member invited to the tournament.

Format
All six of the conference's members participated in the tournament field. They were seeded based on regular season conference records, with the top two teams earning byes into the semifinal round. The other four teams began play in the quarterfinal round.

First round games were played at the home court of the higher-seeded team. All remaining games were played at the Super Pit in Denton, Texas.

Bracket

References

Southland Conference men's basketball tournament
Tournament
Southland Conference men's basketball tournament
Southland Conference men's basketball tournament
Basketball competitions in Texas
Sports in Denton, Texas
College sports tournaments in Texas